Have I Got News for You (often abbreviated as HIGNFY) is a British television panel show produced by Hat Trick Productions for the BBC. From its inception in September 1990 until October 2002, the programme was presented by British comedian Angus Deayton, before he was dismissed after two episodes of the 24th series in the wake of revelations about his private life in the press, whereupon the programme employed the use of guest hosts for the remainder of the series and the 25th series, before making it permanent in June 2003. As of 4 November 2022, in the wake of Deayton's dismissal, the programme has seen 124 people host at least one episode. While the majority have made only one appearance, several have made successive appearances in later series.

List of guest presenters

The following is a list of the guest presenters that have appeared on the programme. The list denotes them by the order in which they first appear by default, and details number of appearances made, the year and series they appeared in, and if they appear or appeared on the programme as a panellist:

See also
List of television presenters
List of Have I Got News for You episodes

References

External links
Have I Got News for You on BBC
 (includes full list of presenters)

BBC-related lists
British television-related lists
Lists of celebrities
Lists of television presenters